Adel Sesay (born 11 December 1990) is a Sierra Leonean sprinter. He competed in the 60 metres at the 2016 IAAF World Indoor Championships.

Competition record

Personal bests
Outdoor
100 metres – 10.59 (+2.3 m/s, Tilburg 2014)
200 metres – 21.87(+1.3 m/s, Brussels 2014)
Indoor
60 metres – 6.87 (Ghent 2014)

References

External links
 
 All-Athletics profile
 

1990 births
Living people
Sierra Leonean male sprinters
Sportspeople from Freetown
Athletes (track and field) at the 2014 Commonwealth Games
Commonwealth Games competitors for Sierra Leone